In financial mathematics, the Hull–White model is a model of future interest rates. In its most generic formulation, it belongs to the class of no-arbitrage models that are able to fit today's term structure of interest rates. It is relatively straightforward to translate the mathematical description of the evolution of future interest rates onto a tree or lattice and so interest rate derivatives such as bermudan swaptions can be valued in the model.

The first Hull–White model was described by John C. Hull and Alan White in 1990. The model is still popular in the market today.

The model

One-factor model
The model is a short-rate model. In general, it has the following dynamics:

There is a degree of ambiguity among practitioners about exactly which parameters in the model are time-dependent or what name to apply to the model in each case. The most commonly accepted naming convention is the following:

 has t (time) dependence — the Hull–White model.

Two-factor model
The two-factor Hull–White model  contains an additional disturbance term whose mean reverts to zero, and is of the form:

where  has an initial value of 0 and follows the process:

Analysis of the one-factor model
For the rest of this article we assume only  has t-dependence.
That is, the stochastic process is a mean-reverting Ornstein–Uhlenbeck process.

θ is calculated from the initial yield curve describing the current term structure of interest rates. Typically α is left as a user input (for example it may be estimated from historical data). σ is determined via calibration to a set of caplets and swaptions readily tradeable in the market.

which has distribution

where  is the normal distribution with mean  and variance .

When  is time-dependent,

which has distribution

Bond pricing using the Hull–White model

It turns out that the time-S value of the T-maturity discount bond has distribution (note the affine term structure here!)

where

Derivative pricing

By selecting as numeraire the time-S bond (which corresponds to switching to the S-forward measure), we have from the fundamental theorem of arbitrage-free pricing, the value at time t of a derivative which has payoff at time S.

Here,  is the expectation taken with respect to the forward measure. Moreover, standard arbitrage arguments show
that the time T forward price  for a payoff at time T given by V(T) must satisfy , thus

Thus it is possible to value many derivatives V dependent solely on a single bond  analytically when working in the Hull–White model. For example, in the case of a bond put

Because  is lognormally distributed, the general calculation used for the Black–Scholes model shows that

where

and

Thus today's value (with the P(0,S) multiplied back in and t set to 0) is:

A fairly substantial amount of algebra shows that it is related to the original parameters via

Note that this expectation was done in the S-bond measure, whereas we did not specify a measure at all for the original Hull–White process. This does not matter — the volatility is all that matters and is measure-independent.

Because interest rate caps/floors are equivalent to bond puts and calls respectively, the above analysis shows that caps and floors can be priced analytically in the Hull–White model. Jamshidian's trick applies to Hull–White (as today's value of a swaption in the Hull–White model is a monotonic function of today's short rate). Thus knowing how to price caps is also sufficient for pricing swaptions. In the even that the underlying is a compounded backward-looking rate rather than a (forward-looking) LIBOR term rate, Turfus (2020) shows how this formula can be straightforwardly modified to take into account the additional convexity.

Swaptions can also be priced directly as described in Henrard (2003). Direct implementations are usually more efficient.

Monte-Carlo simulation, trees and lattices
However, valuing vanilla instruments such as caps and swaptions is useful primarily for calibration. The real use of the model is to value somewhat more exotic derivatives such as bermudan swaptions on a lattice, or other derivatives in a multi-currency context such as Quanto Constant Maturity Swaps, as explained for example in Brigo and Mercurio (2001). The efficient and exact Monte-Carlo simulation of the Hull–White model with time dependent parameters can be easily performed, see Ostrovski (2013) and (2016).

Forecasting
Even though single factor models such as Vasicek, CIR and Hull–White model has been devised for pricing, recent research has shown their potential with regard to forecasting. In Orlando et al. (2018, 2019,) was provided a new methodology to forecast future interest rates called CIR#.
The ideas, apart from turning a short-rate model used for pricing into a forecasting tool, lies in an appropriate partitioning of the dataset into subgroups according to a given distribution ).
In there it was shown how the said partitioning enables capturing statistically significant time changes in volatility of interest rates. following the said approach, Orlando et al. (2021) ) compares the Hull–White model with the CIR model in terms of forecasting and prediction of interest rate directionality.

See also
 Vasicek model
 Cox–Ingersoll–Ross model
 Black–Karasinski model

References

Primary references
John Hull and Alan White, "Using Hull–White interest rate trees," Journal of Derivatives, Vol. 3, No. 3 (Spring 1996), pp. 26–36
John Hull and Alan White, "Numerical procedures for implementing term structure models I," Journal of Derivatives, Fall 1994, pp. 7–16.
John Hull and Alan White, "Numerical procedures for implementing term structure models II," Journal of Derivatives, Winter 1994, pp. 37–48.
John Hull and Alan White, "The pricing of options on interest rate caps and floors using the Hull–White model" in Advanced Strategies in Financial Risk Management, Chapter 4, pp. 59–67.
John Hull and Alan White, "One factor interest rate models and the valuation of interest rate derivative securities," Journal of Financial and Quantitative Analysis, Vol 28, No 2, (June 1993) pp. 235–254.
John Hull and Alan White, "Pricing interest-rate derivative securities", The Review of Financial Studies, Vol 3, No. 4 (1990) pp. 573–592.

Other references

Henrard, Marc (2003). "Explicit Bond Option and Swaption Formula in Heath–Jarrow–Morton One Factor Model," International Journal of Theoretical and Applied Finance, 6(1), 57–72. Preprint SSRN.
Henrard, Marc (2009). Efficient swaptions price in Hull–White one factor model, arXiv, 0901.1776v1. Preprint arXiv.
Ostrovski, Vladimir (2013). Efficient and Exact Simulation of the Hull–White Model, Preprint SSRN.
Ostrovski, Vladimir (2016). Efficient and Exact Simulation of the Gaussian Affine Interest Rate Models., International Journal of Financial Engineering, Vol. 3, No. 02.,Preprint SSRN.
Puschkarski, Eugen. Implementation of Hull–White's No-Arbitrage Term Structure Model, Diploma Thesis, Center for Central European Financial Markets
Turfus, Colin (2020). Caplet Pricing with Backward-Looking Rates., Preprint SSRN.
Letian Wang, Hull–White Model, Fixed Income Quant Group, DTCC (detailed numeric example and derivation)

Interest rates
Fixed income analysis
Short-rate models
Financial models